Jan Chtiej (born 9 December 1937) is a former Polish cyclist. He competed in the individual road race and team time trial events at the 1960 Summer Olympics.

References

External links
 

1937 births
Living people
Polish male cyclists
Olympic cyclists of Poland
Cyclists at the 1960 Summer Olympics
Sportspeople from Nord (French department)
Cyclists from Hauts-de-France